Nidara croceina is a moth in the family Drepanidae. It was described by Paul Mabille in 1898. It is found on Madagascar.

References

Moths described in 1898
Drepaninae